Novosphingobium naphthalenivorans  is a Gram-negative and strictly aerobic bacterium from the genus Novosphingobium which has been isolated from soil which was contaminated with polychlorinated-dioxin in Japan. Novosphingobium naphthalenivorans has the ability to degrade naphthalene.

References

External links
Type strain of Novosphingobium naphthalenivorans at BacDive -  the Bacterial Diversity Metadatabase	

Bacteria described in 2008
Sphingomonadales